Weymouth,  also known as Weymouth by the sea, is a southern suburb of Auckland, New Zealand.

Weymouth is connected to the Auckland Southern Motorway via Mahia Road, an arterial route which cuts across the suburb's northeastern corner.

History 
The Weymouth settlement was surveyed for the first time in 1857, with property sales starting in 1864. The name 'Weymouth' was speculated to be named after an immigrant ship, however, there is no evidence that any ship bearing that name ever visited New Zealand before 1866. It is more probabable that the name was selected because it was thought to sound close to "Waimahia," the Maori name for the area, or as a sentimental homage to the English coastal resort of Weymouth.

All the streets south of Blanes Road were included in the original hamlet when it was surveyed, and several of these streets were named from early European settlers who lived there.

Weymouth's most prominent early use was as the Karaka ferry's embarking location. In order to avoid a lengthy detour via Drury, this bridged the Papakura Channel between Weymouth and Karaka, providing travellers with a direct path to Waiuku in the south. There may have been a private ferry service as early as 1856. In 1860, the Auckland Provincial Council launched the official service. The Karaka Highway Board then took over, but by 1880 the service was shut down.

Since 1872, there have been several plans to construct a bridge between Weymouth and Karaka. Weymouth became a well-liked vacation spot and the location of an annual regatta around the beginning of the 20th century. 

The Weymouth Memorial Hall, was constructed as a privately owned hall in 1926, but was sold to the Manukau County Council in 1940. The Weymouth wharf was inaugurated in 1914. In the 1930s, an oyster farm was located on the shore, and it supplied a number of Auckland restaurants and fish markets with oysters.

Weymouth was relatively isolated from other communities until the development of Clendon Park began in the 1970s. A defined boundary between the two suburbs were introduced by the Weymouth Residents & Ratepayers Association in 1990.

Demographics

Weymouth had a population of 12,213 at the 2018 New Zealand census, an increase of 2,523 people (26.0%) since the 2013 census, and an increase of 2,940 people (31.7%) since the 2006 census. There were 2,949 households, comprising 5,994 males and 6,213 females, giving a sex ratio of 0.96 males per female, with 3,516 people (28.8%) aged under 15 years, 2,967 (24.3%) aged 15 to 29, 4,896 (40.1%) aged 30 to 64, and 831 (6.8%) aged 65 or older.

Ethnicities were 28.1% European/Pākehā, 30.9% Māori, 42.1% Pacific peoples, 19.9% Asian, and 3.3% other ethnicities. People may identify with more than one ethnicity.

The percentage of people born overseas was 33.0, compared with 27.1% nationally.

Although some people chose not to answer the census's question about religious affiliation, 27.3% had no religion, 50.3% were Christian, 3.3% had Māori religious beliefs, 7.7% were Hindu, 2.8% were Muslim, 1.0% were Buddhist and 1.7% had other religions.

Of those at least 15 years old, 1,116 (12.8%) people had a bachelor's or higher degree, and 1,998 (23.0%) people had no formal qualifications. 777 people (8.9%) earned over $70,000 compared to 17.2% nationally. The employment status of those at least 15 was that 4,422 (50.8%) people were employed full-time, 891 (10.2%) were part-time, and 540 (6.2%) were unemployed.

Education
It is a former charter school, and is now a designated special character school which teaches according to "applied Christian values".

Their Māori language unit caters for years 1–8.

Both these schools are coeducational. Rolls are as of

References

Suburbs of Auckland
Populated places around the Manukau Harbour